Events in the year 1869 in Norway.

Incumbents
Monarch: Charles IV

Events
14 August – Charles Wilhelm Thesen leaves Norway in his 117-ton schooner Albatros, loaded with timber to sell in New Zealand.
16 November – Charles Wilhelm Thesen arrives in Cape Town.  After bad weather delays his onward journey, he decides to stay in South Africa.

Arts and literature
3 April – Edvard Grieg's Piano Concerto in A minor receives its première in Copenhagen, played by Edmund Neupert, with Holger Simon Paulli conducting.

Births

January to June
 

18 February – Johan Hjort, fisheries scientist, marine zoologist and oceanographer (died 1948)
23 March – Waldemar Ager, newspaperman and author in America (died 1941)
1 April – Peter Egge, writer (died 1959)
11 April – Gustav Vigeland, sculptor (died 1943)
5 May – Hjalmar Christensen, writer (died 1925)
8 May – Andreas Tostrup Urbye, politician and Minister (died 1955)
15 June – Anna Gjøstein, politician and proponent for women's rights pioneer (died 1956).

July to December
 

5 July – Holger Sinding-Larsen, architect (died 1938)
31 July – Johannes Irgens, diplomat, politician and Minister (died 1939)
23 August – Rasmus Olai Mortensen, politician and Minister (died 1934)
13 September – Kristen Holbø, painter and illustrator (died 1953)
17 September – Christian Lous Lange, historian, teacher and political scientist, shared the Nobel Peace Prize in 1921 (died 1938)
29 September – Harald Sohlberg, painter (died 1935)
5 October – Gitta Jønsson, politician and proponent for women's rights (died 1950).
11 October – Johan Aschehoug Kiær, paleontologist and geologist (died 1931)

Deaths
6 March – Niels Nielsen Vogt, priest and politician (born 1798)
28 October – Gustav Peter Blom, politician (born 1785)

Full date unknown
Melchior Schjelderup Olsson Fuhr, politician (born 1790)
Jon Eriksson Helland II, Hardanger fiddle maker (born 1849)
Bernt Sverdrup Maschmann, priest and politician (born 1805)
Christopher Simonsen Fougner, politician (born 1795)

See also

References